Ely Airport  (Yelland Field) is a county-owned airport three miles northeast of Ely, in White Pine County, Nevada, United States.

The Federal Aviation Administration says this airport had 239 passenger boardings (enplanements) in calendar year 2008, 216 in 2009 and 245 in 2010. The National Plan of Integrated Airport Systems for 2011–2015 categorized it as a general aviation airport.

History

Historical airline service
Ely's first airline service began with United Airlines in 1955 providing one daily direct flight each to Salt Lake City and San Francisco using Convair 340 aircraft. The flight to San Francisco made stops in Elko and Reno, Nevada, as well as Sacramento and Oakland, California. Service was later upgraded using Douglas DC-6s that continued into 1970. This was United's last service using piston engine propeller aircraft. United then began a subcontract arrangement with Frontier Airlines (1950-1986) using Convair 580s for its Ely service. In 1977, United brought the service back in house using Boeing 737-200 jets flying a San Francisco - Reno - Elko - Ely - Salt Lake City - Denver route with one daily round trip.  Ely was the smallest destination ever to be served year round by United jets. United's service ended on April 1, 1982.

Scenic Airlines also served Ely from about 1973 through 1976 with flights to Las Vegas using Cessna 402 aircraft. Chaparral Aviation flew from Ely to several smaller communities throughout northern Nevada in 1981 and 1982.

With the Airline Deregulation Act of 1978, service to Ely became subsidized under the Essential Air Service program so that the city would not lose all service. A series of commuter airlines then provided service to Ely.

SkyWest Airlines provided service to Salt Lake City (SLC) as well as Elko and Reno, Nevada, offering three daily flights each using Piper Navajo aircraft. In 1986, SkyWest began operating as Western Express, a code-share affiliate for Western Airlines which had built a major hub at SLC. Service was reduced to only one daily roundtrip to SLC using a larger Fairchild Swearingen Metroliner aircraft. Western Airlines merged with Delta Air Lines in 1987, and the SkyWest flight then took on the designation as Delta Connection. Service continued until 1996.

Alpine Aviation provided two daily flights to SLC from 1996 through 1999 using Piper Cheyenne aircraft.

Scenic Airlines returned to Ely from 1999 through 2006 with flights to North Las Vegas Airport and Elko Regional Airport. 
   
On November 12, 2006, Air Midwest began flights to McCarran International Airport in Las Vegas via Cedar City Regional Airport in Cedar City, Utah, using Beechcraft 1900Ds. The stop in Cedar City was due to the fact that McCarran Airport requires Transportation Security Administration screening not available at Ely. The return flights operated nonstop from Las Vegas to Ely. The service began as America West Express, a feeder service for America West Airlines. America West merged with US Airways in 2007 at which time the service became US Airways Express. This service ended in mid-2008.

Great Lakes Aviation then took over serving Ely with Beechcraft 1900Ds as well. At first, a single flight to Denver was operated with a stop at Moab, Utah. In 2011, the service was switched to one daily nonstop flight to Las Vegas. Great Lakes service ended in March, 2013, as passenger traffic fell below the minimum required to maintain subsidies.  Ely has not seen scheduled airline service since.

Facilities
Ely Airport covers 4,999 acres (2,023 ha) at an elevation of 6,259 feet (1,908 m). It has two asphalt runways: 18/36 is 6,018 by 150 feet (1,834 x 46 m) and 12/30 is 4,825 by 60 feet (1,471 x 18 m).

In the year ending July 31, 2011, the airport had 4,997 aircraft operations, average 13 per day: 54% air taxi, 32% general aviation, 11% airline and 3% military. 19 aircraft were then based here: 42% single-engine, 32% glider, and 26% ultralight.

References

Other sources 

 Essential Air Service documents (Docket OST-1995-361) from the U.S. Department of Transportation:
 Order 2006-4-9: selecting Scenic Airlines, Inc., to continue to provide subsidized essential air service at Ely, Nevada, consisting of six nonstop round trips a week to Elko and six nonstop round trips a week to North Las Vegas Airport, for a new two-year term, through February 29, 2008.
 Order 2006-8-29: selecting Mesa Air Group Inc. d/b/a Air Midwest to provide subsidized essential air service (EAS) at Merced and Visalia, California, and Ely, Nevada, for two years, beginning when the carrier inaugurates service. Merced and Visalia will receive 23 weekly round trips to Las Vegas, operated on a Las Vegas - Merced - Visalia - Las Vegas or Las Vegas - Visalia - Merced - Las Vegas routing at an annual subsidy rate of $1,599,207. Ely will receive 6 nonstop round trips each week to Salt Lake City at an annual subsidy rate of $647,709. Air Midwest will operate as America West Express/US Airways Express and serve each community with 19-passenger Beech 1900-Ds.
 Order 2008-6-26: selecting Great Lakes Aviation, Ltd. to provide subsidized essential air service (EAS) at Merced and Visalia, California, and Ely, Nevada, for the two-year period beginning when the carrier inaugurates full EAS pursuant to this Order, at an annual subsidy of $4,900,401 with 19-seat Beech 1900Ds.
 Order 2010-9-13: re-selecting Great Lakes Aviation, Ltd., to provide subsidized essential air service (EAS) with 19-passenger Beechcraft B-1900Ds at Merced and Visalia, California, and Ely, Nevada, from October 1, 2010, through September 31, 2012. The annual subsidy rates will be $1,961,174, $1,746,507, and $1,752,067 for Merced, Visalia and Ely, respectively, for a total of $5,459,748.

External links 

  from Nevada DOT
 

Airports in Nevada
Transportation in White Pine County, Nevada
Buildings and structures in White Pine County, Nevada
Former Essential Air Service airports